Pierre Larchier (born 15 July 1947) is a French luger. He competed in the men's singles event at the 1972 Winter Olympics.

References

1947 births
Living people
French male lugers
Olympic lugers of France
Lugers at the 1972 Winter Olympics
Sportspeople from Lyon